Sharankumar Limbale (born June 1, 1956) is a Marathi language author, poet and literary critic. He has penned more than 40 books. His best known work is his autobiography Akkarmashi published in 1984. Akkarmashi has been translated to several other Indian languages and English. The English translation has been published by the Oxford University Press with the title The Outcaste.

His critical work Towards an Aesthetics of Dalit Literature (2004) is considered amongst the most important works on Dalit literature. It discusses how Dalit anubhava (experiences) should take precedence over anuman (speculation).

Awards and honours 
 Saraswati Samman, 2020

Bibliography
 Akkarmashi (English translation: The Outcaste), 1984 -- His autobiography which was published when he was 25 years old. It is a critically acclaimed work considered a landmark in Dalit literature. 
 Udrek
 Uplya
 O
 Gavkusabaheril katha
 Jhund
 Dangal
 Dalit Aatmakatha - Ek Akalan
 Dalit Brahman
 Dalit Panther
 Dalit Premkavita (literally meaning "Dalit Love Poems")
 Dalit Brahman
 Dalit Sahitya Aani Soundarya (literally meaning "Dalit Literature and Beauty")
 Dalit Sahityache Soundaryashastra (literally meaning "The Aesthetics of Dalit Literature")
 Punha Akkarmashi
 Pradnyasurya-- Biography of Dr Babasaheb Ambedkar

 Bahujan

Notes and references

Interview with Jaydeep Sarangi, JSL, 2012/13 (Autumn), JNU, New Delhi.

1956 births
Living people
Recipients of the Saraswati Samman Award
Marathi-language writers
Dalit writers
People from Maharashtra